Aurora Christian Schools (ACS) is a private Christian school with grades preschool through high school in Aurora, Illinois.

It opened as a Kindergarten through grade 9 school on September 3, 1975. Eighty-two students enrolled at the beginning of the first school year, and enrollment climbed to 114 at the end of the year. The private school has since expanded and now offers Pre-K through 12th.

Athletics
Aurora Christian offers a total of thirteen varsity/non-varsity sports to its students. These include: cross country, football, golf, soccer, volleyball, boys' and girls' basketball, wrestling, baseball, softball, track, cheer, and poms.

References

External links
 Aurora Christian High School

Private high schools in Illinois
Private middle schools in Illinois
Private elementary schools in Illinois
Education in Aurora, Illinois
Christian schools in Illinois
1975 establishments in Illinois
Educational institutions established in 1975